Los Cabos Magazine is a Mexican lifestyle and tourism magazine with a special reference to Los Cabos. The magazine was founded in 1993. From 2007 it is published on a quarterly basis. The magazine is published in English and provides information about Los Cabos targeting tourists as well as local residents. Its headquarters is in Cabo San Lucas. It also has offices in San Diego, United States.

References

External links
 Official website

1993 establishments in Mexico
City guides
English-language magazines
Lifestyle magazines
Local interest magazines
Magazines established in 1993
Mass media in Baja California
Magazines published in Mexico
Quarterly magazines
Tourism magazines